"She's Single Again" is a song written by Peter McCann and Charlie Craig and recorded by American country music artist Janie Fricke.  It was released in May 1985 as the first single from the album Somebody Else's Fire.  The song reached #2 on the Billboard Hot Country Singles chart. The song was also recorded by Reba McEntire for her 1985 album, Have I Got a Deal for You.

Chart performance

References

1985 songs
1985 singles
Songs written by Charlie Craig
Songs written by Peter McCann
Janie Fricke songs
Reba McEntire songs
Song recordings produced by Bob Montgomery (songwriter)
Columbia Records singles